Gene Black (September 23, 1943  - October 4, 2010 ) was an American NASCAR Grand National driver who competed from 1965 to 1968.

Summary
Black was born in Arden, North Carolina. He accumulated six finishes in the top ten in his career in addition to $10,650 ($ when adjusted for inflation) in total career earnings. On average, Black began his races in 25th while ending them in 19th. His career lasted three years. Black was a competitor at the 1968 Fireball 300 in addition to other events like the 1966 Southeastern 500, the 1968 Islip 300, and the 1968 Fireball 300.

His racing performance was the most powerful on dirt tracks where people expected him to finish an average of 11th place. However, Black tended to perform less proficiently on road courses; finishing a meager average of 40th place.

References

1943 births
2010 deaths
NASCAR drivers
People from Arden, North Carolina
Racing drivers from North Carolina
People from Fletcher, North Carolina